The Wiener Neustadt Canal was Austria's only shipping canal, originally meant to reach to Trieste.  It became operational in 1803 and ceased to be used for transportation before World War I.

References 
 Fritz Lange: Von Wien zur Adria – Der Wiener Neustädter Kanal, 2003, 
 Valerie Else Riebe: Der Wiener Neustädter Schiffahrtskanal, 1936

External links 

 
 Josef Kovats: Documentary Trailer (German)
 Heinrich Tinhofer: WalkingInside - Forum Canal Independent Initiative for Revitalising the Canal (automatically translated).

Ship canals
Wiener Neustadt
Buildings and structures in Simmering (Vienna)
Canals in Austria
Buildings and structures in Lower Austria
Canals opened in 1803